Lubbock is a city in Texas.

Lubbock may also refer to:

Lubbock (surname), includes a list of persons with the name
Lubbock County, Texas
Lubbock High School
Lubbock metropolitan area
Lubbock Cotton Kings, a minor-league ice hockey team
Lubbock Renegades, an arena football team
Lubbock (crater), a small lunar crater
Lubbock (On Everything), a 1979 country music album by Terry Allen
Lubbock, a character from Akame ga Kill!

See also
Lubbock Preston Smith International Airport
Lubbock Christian University
Lubbock Municipal Coliseum
Lubbock Lake Landmark
Lubbock Tornado, a Fujita scale F5 tornado that occurred in the city on May 11, 1970
Lubbock Lights
Lubok, a Russian popular print